The 2007–08 Senior Women's One Day League was the 2nd edition of the women's List A cricket competition in India. It took place between September and November 2007, with 27 teams divided into five regional groups. Railways won the tournament, beating Maharashtra in the final, claiming their second One Day League title.

Competition format
The 27 teams competing in the tournament were divided into five zonal groups: Central, East, North, South and West. The tournament operated on a round-robin format, with each team playing every other team in their group once. The top two sides from each group progressed to the knockout stages. Matches were played using a 50 over format.

The groups worked on a points system with positions with the groups being based on the total points. Points were awarded as follows:

Win: 4 points. 
Tie: 2 points. 
Loss: –1 points. 
No Result/Abandoned: 2 points. 
Bonus Points: 1 point available per match. 
Consolation Points: 1 point available per match.

If points in the final table are equal, teams are separated by most wins, then head-to-head record, then number of Bonus Points, then Net Run Rate.

Zonal Tables

Central Zone

East Zone

North Zone

South Zone

West Zone

 Advanced to Quarter-Finals.
 Advanced to Pre-Quarter-Finals.

Source:CricketArchive

Knockout stage

Pre-Quarter-finals

Quarter-finals

Semi-finals

Final

Statistics

Most runs

Source: CricketArchive

Most wickets

Source: CricketArchive

References

Women's Senior One Day Trophy
Senior Women's One Day League
Senior Women's One Day League